The 1954 Cleveland Indians advanced to the World Series for the first time in six years. It was the team's third American League championship in franchise history. The Indians' 111–43 record is the all-time record for winning percentage by an American League team (.721), as this was before 162 games were played in a season.

For more than 60 years, Cleveland had been the only team in Major League Baseball to have compiled two different 11-game winning streaks within the same season, until the Toronto Blue Jays were able to accomplish the rare feat during the 2015 regular season.

However, their great regular-season record would not be enough to win the World Series, as the Indians got swept in four games by the New York Giants, after which the Indians would not return to the Fall Classic until 1995.

Offseason
 February 19, 1954: Bill Upton and Lee Wheat were traded by the Indians to the Philadelphia Athletics for Dave Philley.

Regular season

Season standings

Record vs. opponents

Notable transactions
 April 12, 1954: Hal Newhouser was signed as a free agent by the Indians.
 June 1, 1954: Bob Chakales was traded by the Indians to the Baltimore Orioles for Vic Wertz.

Roster

Player stats

Batting

Starters by position
Note: Pos = Position; G = Games played; AB = At bats; H = Hits; Avg. = Batting average; HR = Home runs; RBI = Runs batted in

Other batters
Note: G = Games played; AB = At bats; H = Hits; Avg. = Batting average; HR = Home runs; RBI = Runs batted in

Pitching

Starting pitchers
Note: G = Games pitched; IP = Innings pitched; W = Wins; L = Losses; ERA = Earned run average; SO = Strikeouts

Relief pitchers
Note: G = Games pitched; W = Wins; L = Losses; SV = Saves; ERA = Earned run average; SO = Strikeouts

1954 World Series 

This was the first time (and only to date) that the Cleveland Indians were swept in a World Series. The only highlight for the Indians was that they kept the Yankees from winning their sixth straight series. The last time the Yankees had not won the series or pennant beforehand was 1948, when, again, the Indians kept them out (although that year, they won the Series). It was also the only World Series from 1949 to 1958 which did not feature the Yankees.

Game 1
September 29, 1954, at the Polo Grounds in New York

Game 2
September 30, 1954, at the Polo Grounds in New York

Game 3
October 1, 1954, at Cleveland Stadium in Cleveland, Ohio

Game 4
October 2, 1954, at Cleveland Stadium in Cleveland, Ohio

Composite Box
1954 World Series (4–0): New York Giants (N.L.) over Cleveland Indians (A.L.)

Award winners

All-Star Game
 Al Rosen, first baseman, starter
 Bobby Ávila, second baseman, starter
 Larry Doby, reserve
 Mike Garcia, reserve
 Bob Lemon, reserve

Farm system

LEAGUE CHAMPIONS: Fargo-Moorhead

The 1954 Indianapolis Indians featured Herb Score and Rocky Colavito. Colavito hit 38 home runs and accumulated 116 RBIs.

Notes

References
1954 Cleveland Indians team page at Baseball Reference
1954 Cleveland Indians team page at www.baseball-almanac.com
1954 World Series page at Baseball Reference

External links
1954 Cleveland Indians at BaseballLibrary.com

American League champion seasons
Cleveland Indians seasons
Cleveland Indians season
Cleveland Indians